The Shamong Township School District is a community public school district that serves students in pre-kindergarten through eighth grade from Shamong Township, in Burlington County, New Jersey, United States.

As of the 2018–19 school year, the district, comprising two schools, had an enrollment of 746 students and 64.5 classroom teachers (on an FTE basis), for a student–teacher ratio of 11.6:1.

The district is classified by the New Jersey Department of Education as being in District Factor Group "GH", the third-highest of eight groupings. District Factor Groups organize districts statewide to allow comparison by common socioeconomic characteristics of the local districts. From lowest socioeconomic status to highest, the categories are A, B, CD, DE, FG, GH, I and J.

Public school students in Shamong Township in ninth through twelfth grades attend Seneca High School located in Tabernacle Township, which also serves students from Southampton Township, Tabernacle Township and Woodland Township. The school is part of the Lenape Regional High School District, which also serves students from Evesham Township, Medford Lakes, Medford Township and Mount Laurel Township. As of the 2018–19 school year, the high school had an enrollment of 1,137 students and 109.5 classroom teachers (on an FTE basis), for a student–teacher ratio of 10.4:1.

Schools
Schools in the district (with 2018–19 enrollment data from the National Center for Education Statistics) are:
Elementary school
Indian Mills Elementary School with 394 students in grades PreK-4
Nicole Moore, Principal
Middle school
Indian Mills Memorial Middle School with 348 students in grades 5-8
Timothy Carroll, Principal

Administration
Core members of the district's administration are:
Christine Vespe, Superintendent
Laura Archer, Business Administrator / Board Secretary

Board of education
The district's board of education, with five members, sets policy and oversees the fiscal and educational operation of the district through its administration. As a Type II school district, the board's trustees are elected directly by voters to serve three-year terms of office on a staggered basis, with either one or two seats up for election each year held (since 2012) as part of the November general election.

References

External links 
Shamong Township Public Schools

School Data for the Shamong Township Public Schools, National Center for Education Statistics
Seneca High School
Lenape Regional High School District

Shamong Township, New Jersey
New Jersey District Factor Group GH
School districts in Burlington County, New Jersey